Salmonberry or salmonberries may refer to:
 Rubus spectabilis, plant species native to western Canada and the United States
 Salmonberries (film), a 1991 film by Percy Adlon
 Salmonberry River, a river in northwestern Oregon, United States
 Salmonberry Trail, a scenic trail along said river